Canadian Forces Detachment Alsask (CFD Alsask) was a military radar station in the Rural Municipality of Milton No. 292, just north of the hamlet of Alsask, Saskatchewan, Canada, a village on the Alberta-Saskatchewan border. It is within the Rural Municipality of Milton No. 292. 

RCAF Station Station Alsask was opened in 1963 as part of the Pinetree Line of NORAD radar stations.   The station was later renamed CFD Alsask when the military branches were merged.  The station was part of 44 Radar Squadron and had a call sign of November, Jade Ring. The station was disbanded in 1987 and has been taken over by the village. The station property became part of the Rural Municipality of Milton when the village of Alsask was dissolved in 2009.

The station consisted of three radar domes, housing, a school, swimming pool, with a staff complement of 125 (military) and 60 civilian workers.

Alsask Radar Dome
The one remaining radar dome, built in 1961, was designated a heritage property in 2002.

  The structure situated on the 2.5 hectare parcel of land houses a fiberglass dome used to protect the radar equipment from the weather on a three-story tower, with the lower stores consisting of a computer level and command/control level. It was jointly utilized by the Canadian and American governments for monitoring Soviet activity in the North American airspace. The first floor contained the transmitter equipment and the second floor housed the receiver-associated equipment.

It was disbanded in 1987 and was designated a heritage property in 2002.  Due to vandalism, the entrance stairs were removed.

The site is currently managed by the Canadian Civil Defence Museum and Archives and is open periodically for tours.

Construction
Construction of the dome began in 1961 and the dome was completed two years later. The dome, which protects the radar equipment, is made of fibreglass. The tower itself is made of steel with metal cladding.

References

External links
 Pinetreeline.org -  Description of Alsask
 Site
 Badge

Canadian Forces bases in Saskatchewan
Royal Canadian Air Force stations
Milton No. 292, Saskatchewan
Alsask
Division No. 13, Saskatchewan